, was a Japanese video game corporation founded in 1967. It had its headquarters in Kudankita, Chiyoda, Tokyo. Its subsidiary, Tecmo Inc, was located in Torrance, California. Tecmo was formerly known as Tehkan.

Tecmo is known for the Captain Tsubasa, Dead or Alive, Deception, Fatal Frame, Gallop Racer, Monster Rancher, Ninja Gaiden, Rygar, Star Force and Tecmo Bowl video game series. When it was still called Tehkan, the company released arcade games such as Bomb Jack, Gridiron Fight and Tehkan World Cup. The company was founded on July 31, 1967 as a supplier of cleaning equipment. By 1969, it started to sell amusement equipment.

In 2009, Tecmo merged with Koei to form the holding company Tecmo Koei Holdings and was operated as a subsidiary until its disbandment in early 2010. In April 2010, Tecmo was dissolved and its video game franchises are now published by Koei Tecmo Games. Tecmo is also the name of a distinct video game development company that was established in March 2010,  but later folded into Koei Tecmo Games in April 2011.

History

Early history
Tecmo Co., Ltd, which merged with Koei in 2009, was itself the combination of two companies: Imperial Trustee Corporation (founded in 1964) and Nippon Yacht Co, Ltd (founded in 1967).

Imperial Trustee Corporation
The origins of Tecmo dates to September 1964 as the Imperial Trustee Corporation, a company specialized in the management of building maintenance including the supplying of cleaning equipment.  In July 1969, the company started to sell entertainment amusement equipment and opened its first self-managed amusement facility in March 1970 in Chiba Prefecture.

In October 1977, the Imperial Trustee Corporation was renamed "Tehkan Ltd", with the trade name changed as well to "Tehkan". Tehkan is derived from the name , the company’s original Japanese name.

In March 1981, a U.S. division was inaugurated in Los Angeles as "U.S. Tehkan, Inc.". A month later, in April 1981, Tehkan released in Japan its first internally developed arcade video game, titled "Pleiads" (which was distributed in America by Centuri).

On January 8, 1986, Tehkan Ltd officially changed its name to Tecmo Co, Ltd. Tecmo's first internally developed home video game Mighty Bomb Jack was released for the Family Computer in April 1986.

Nippon Yacht Co, Ltd
On July 31, 1967, the Nippon Yacht Corporation was established to handle the real estate of ships.

On December 6, 1982, Nippon Yacht Co, Ltd was renamed "Tehkan Electronics Corporation".

Merger of Tecmo and Tehkan Electronics Corporation. Focus on console video games
On April 1, 1987, Tecmo Co., Ltd merged with its sister company Tehkan Electronics Corporation. The former's name was retained for the merger but the latter was the actual surviving company.

By the turn of the decade, Tecmo was firmly in the camp of video game consoles. Though still involved in the arcade industry, much of the  success was achieved on the Nintendo Entertainment System with titles such as  Ninja Gaiden, Tecmo Bowl and the Japan-only  Tsuppari Ōzumō. When Sony released its PlayStation in the 1990s, Tecmo joined the endeavor which set the tone for series such as Dead or Alive, Monster Rancher, Deception and Gallop Racer.

In January 2006, Junji Nakamura resigns as president of Tecmo, while Yoshimi Yasuda was named his successor.

On July 18, 2006, Tecmo's founder and chairman Yoshihito Kakihara died of interstitial pneumonia at the age  of 67.

Tecmo entered the second section of Tokyo Stock Exchange in March 2000 and transitioned  to the first section in March 2001. It delisted on March 26, 2009 right before the merger with Koei took effect.

Lawsuit
On the June 3, 2008 Team Ninja head Tomonobu Itagaki resigned from the company and filed a 145 million yen ($1.4 million) lawsuit against Tecmo president, Yoshimi Yasuda, for "unpaid completion bonuses" and "emotional distress". This was followed by another lawsuit filed on the 16th of June by two plaintiffs on behalf of Tecmo's 300 employees for unpaid wages amounting to ¥8.3 million.

Merger with Koei
On August 29, 2008 Square Enix made plans for a friendly takeover of Tecmo by purchasing shares at a 30 percent premium with a total bid of ¥22.3 billion. On September 4, 2008 Tecmo officially declined the takeover proposal. Tecmo subsequently engaged in talks with Koei about a possible merger between the two companies, and agreed in November 2008 to merge on April 1, 2009 to form Tecmo Koei Holdings.

On January 26, 2009 the two companies officially announced the merger, and the holding company formed on April 1, 2009 as planned. Tecmo initially continued to be operated as a subsidiary and brandname of Tecmo Koei Holdings. In January 2010, the United States subsidiaries of Tecmo Inc. and Koei America merged to create Tecmo Koei America Corporation.

Tecmo was effectively declared disbanded in Japan on April 1, 2010, as part of a major international reorganization within Tecmo Koei Holdings. Relevant intellectual properties were slated to be further managed by Koei Tecmo Games.

On March 15, 2010, and roughly two weeks before Tecmo was dissolved, its internal development studio was spun off as a separate company under the name of "Tecmo Co, Ltd.", a wholly owned subsidiary of Koei Tecmo Games. This new company was initially called "Tehkan" to avoid confusion with the other company that was still operating for another two weeks. When Tecmo disbanded on April 1, 2010, Tekhan was renamed Tecmo. This was short-lived as the new Tecmo along with the new Koei video game developers were both dissolved and merged into Koei Tecmo  Games a year later, on April 1, 2011.

Despite having been dissolved twice as a legal entity, Tecmo continued to appear as a label on video games by Koei Tecmo Games until another corporate reorganization in 2016 abandoned the brand name for good. Video games by Koei Tecmo Games marketed with the Tecmo logotype included   Dead or Alive 5, Ninja Gaiden 3: Razor's Edge and Deception IV: The Nightmare Princess.

Subsidiaries
 Team Ninja, started in 1995.
 Team Tachyon, started in 2007.

Games

References

External links
 Official website

Koei Tecmo
Amusement companies of Japan
Software companies based in Tokyo
Video game companies established in 1967
Video game companies disestablished in 2010
Defunct video game companies of Japan
Video game publishers
Japanese companies established in 1967
Japanese companies disestablished in 2010

pt:Koei Tecmo Holdings#Tecmo